Cristian Gabriel Esparza (born 30 January 1993), known as Gabriel Esparza, is an Argentine footballer who plays for Audax Italiano as a winger.

References

External links
 
 

1993 births
Living people
Argentine footballers
Argentine expatriate footballers
Argentine Primera División players
Paraguayan Primera División players
Chilean Primera División players
Liga MX players
San Lorenzo de Almagro footballers
Club Atlético Temperley footballers
Club Puebla players
Club Guaraní players
Club Atlético Colón footballers
Club Sol de América footballers
Audax Italiano footballers
Association football midfielders
Argentine expatriate sportspeople in Chile
Argentine expatriate sportspeople in Mexico
Argentine expatriate sportspeople in Paraguay
Expatriate footballers in Chile
Expatriate footballers in Mexico
Expatriate footballers in Paraguay
Sportspeople from Tucumán Province